CTNS may also refer to the Center for Theology and the Natural Sciences.

CTNS is the gene that encodes the protein cystinosin in humans. Cystinosin is a lysosomal seven-transmembrane protein that functions as an active transporter for the export of cystine molecules out of the lysosome.

Mutations in CTNS are responsible for cystinosis, an autosomal recessive lysosomal storage disease.

Gene 
The CTNS gene is located on the p arm of human chromosome 17, at position 13.2. It spans base pairs 3,636,468 and 3,661,542, and comprises 12 exons.

In 1995, the gene was localized to the short arm of chromosome 17.  An international collaborative effort finally succeeded in isolating CTNS by positional cloning in 1998.

The CTNSN323K, CTNSK280R, and CTNSN288K mutations completely stop the movement of CySS out of the lysosome via cystinosin.[2] interestingly, CTNSN323K and CTNSK280R are related to juvenile nephropathic cystinosis while CTNSN288K mutations are found in cases with infantile nephropathic cystinosis.

Tissue distribution 
The gene is expressed in the lysosomes of all organs and tissues. Cystinosin has also been found in melanosomes in melanocytes.

Structure 
Cystinosin is a seven-transmembrane domain receptor embedded in the lysosomal membrane, and is a member of the lysosomal cystine transporter family of transport proteins. It comprises 367 amino acid residues, and has a molecular mass of 41738 Da. Cystinosin has seven N-glycosylation sites in the N-terminus region, spanning a range of 128 amino acid residues.

The receptor also has two sorting motifs; a GYDQL motif in the C-terminus region, and a YFPQA motif, known as the 'PQ loop,' on the fifth inter-transmembrane α-helix moiety.

Cystinosin embeds in the lysosomal membrane with the C-terminus region facing the cytosol and the N-terminus region facing the lumen.

Mechanism 

The protein obeys Michaelis-Menton kinetics and has an associated KM of 278 ± 49 μM.

The GYDQL and YFPQA motifs on the C-terminal binds cystinosin to the lysosome. Mutations in the GYDQL motif cause a repositioning of cystinosin to being partially on the plasma membrane and partially on the lysosome. Mutations in both GYDQL and YFPQA motifs cause cystinosin to position itself to the plasma membrane instead of lysosomes

An increase in acidity in the lumen of the lysosome initiates the reaction of CySS and H+ being transported into the cytosol.

Function 
Cystinosin functions as a symporter which actively transports protons and cystine, the oxidized cysteine dimer, out of the lysosome. Cystinosin only transports L-CySS while other cystine transporters will work on various amino acids. If cystine builds up in the lysosome it will inhibit the normal functioning of the organelle making the transport function important in the regular functioning of cells.

Cystinosin has also been discovered in melanosomes and has been linked to the control and regulation of melanin.

Clinical significance

Cystinosis 
Mutations in CTNS gene can result in cystinosis. Cystinosis is a type of lysosomal transport disorder, a subset of lysosomal storage disorders. Variation in the encoded cystinosin protein results in an inhibition or loss in its ability to transport cystine out of the lysosome. Cystine molecules accumulate and form crystals within the lysosome, impairing its function.

Mutations 
Cystinosis is presented in patients with a range of CTNS mutations; as of 2017, over 100 have been identified. The most common mutation is a 57,257 base pair deletion commonly referred to as the 57 kb deletion. This was formally known as the 65 kb deletion; a misnomer originating from early incorrect estimates. Other reported mutations include other deletions, missense mutations, and in-frame deletions and insertions.

The type and extent of mutation determines the type and severity of cystinosis in the carrier. This is a result of the degree of transport inhibition caused by the misfolding of cystinosin. For example, mild cystinosis is typically associated with mutations that do not affect the amino acids in the transmembrane domains of cystinosin. In contrast, infantile nephropathic cystinosis, the most severe form of the disease, is most commonly associated with a total loss of activity.

Gene deletion resulting in the absence of either of the sorting motifs results in the delocalization of cystinosin to the cellular plasma membrane.

Model systems 
Human models for cystinosin are typically derived from cystinotic renal tubular cell lines.

Non-human protein homologs for cystinosin include ERS1 in Saccharomyces cerevisiae (yeast cells) and the Caenorhabditis elegans protein, C41C4.7. Murine ctns has also been used.

See also 
 Cystinosis
 Lysosomal storage disorders
 Lysosomal Cystine Transporter Family

References

Further reading

External links 
 GeneReviews/NCBI/NIH/UW entry on Cystinosis
 
 Genetics Home Reference page on CTNS.
 Genetic Testing Registry.